The Wych Elm cultivar Ulmus glabra 'Latifolia Aurea' was listed by Schelle in Beissner et al, Handbuch der Laubholz-Benennung (1903), as Ulmus glabra Miller latifolia aurea, but without description. In the Netherlands in the late 19th and early 20th centuries, however, Ulmus montana latifolia aurea was a synonym of the wych cultivar 'Lutescens', and Green reclassified Schelle's 'Latifolia aurea' as a form of U. glabra Hudson.

Description
Not available, but the name suggests a broad leaf with a yellow coloration.

Cultivation
No specimens labelled 'Latifolia Aurea' are known to survive, though 'Lutescens' remains in cultivation.

References

External links
  Sheet labelled U. latifolia aurea, Oudenbosch, 1924

Wych elm cultivar
Ulmus articles missing images
Ulmus
Missing elm cultivars